The Fourth Presbyterian Church of Chicago is one of the largest congregations of the Presbyterian Church (U.S.A.), located in the Magnificent Mile neighborhood of Chicago, directly across Michigan Avenue from the John Hancock Center.

History
The Fourth Presbyterian Church of Chicago was formed on February 12, 1871, by the merger of Westminster Presbyterian Church and North Presbyterian Church.  The combined congregation dedicated a new church building on Sunday, October 8, 1871. The Great Chicago Fire began later that day and destroyed the young congregation's new sanctuary.

The congregation subsequently built a second building, located at the corner of Rush Street and Superior Street, which it dedicated February 1874.

After nearly 40 years at that location, in 1912, the congregation built a new building on Pine Street (now North Michigan Avenue), which was then a fairly undeveloped part of the city. The congregation employed architect Ralph Adams Cram to create a Gothic Revival building of dressed limestone. Cram, who also designed the Cathedral of St. John the Divine in New York City, worked on both churches simultaneously during 1912. Only Fourth Presbyterian was completed, however, and was dedicated in 1914. In contrast, St. John the Divine is still officially unfinished and is considered a work in progress.

Cram designed and built the sanctuary however the parish house, cloister, manse, and garth, which lie to the south along Michigan Avenue, were designed by Howard Van Doren Shaw. The church building is the oldest structure on North Michigan Avenue, with the exception of the Chicago Water Tower, and is listed on the National Register of Historic Places.

In 1884, the congregation worked with Rush Medical College to establish the city's Presbyterian Hospital

Statistics

According to the PC (USA), in 2013 Fourth Church had 5,540 members, the second-largest Presbyterian congregation in the United States.

In 2015 at Fourth Church, Quimby Pipe Organs installed a three-million-dollar instrument with five manuals, 143 ranks, and 8,343 pipes, the largest in the midwestern United States.

Pastors
Shortly before the turn of the 19th century, Rev. M. Woolsey Stryker (1885-1892), a widely quoted pundit as well as prolific hymnwriter, served as pastor but left Chicago to become President of his alma mater, Hamilton College, in upstate New York. Reverend John Buchanan, who held the post of senior pastor for 25 years, retired as of January 31, 2012. In March 2014, Fourth Presbyterian's members voted at a congregational meeting for the Reverend Shannon Johnson Kershner to lead the church as its next pastor commencing on May 1, 2014.

References

External links

Fourth Presbyterian Church

20th-century Presbyterian church buildings in the United States
Churches in Chicago
Gothic Revival church buildings in Illinois
Howard Van Doren Shaw church buildings
Presbyterian Church (USA) churches
Presbyterian churches in Illinois
Properties of religious function on the National Register of Historic Places in Chicago
Ralph Adams Cram church buildings
Churches completed in 1914
Religious organizations established in 1871
Churches on the National Register of Historic Places in Illinois
1914 establishments in Illinois